is a Japanese professional footballer who plays as a midfielder for Nankatsu SC. He is a retired international for the Japan national team.

Club career
Inamoto was born in Kagoshima Prefecture. He played for Japanese club Gamba Osaka during his last year of high school, signing with the club in 1997. In April when at the age of 17, he debuted opening match in 1997 J.League season, which made him the youngest player who played J.League (at that time). He played for Gamba until summer 2001 and played 118 matches in J1 League. He was then one of many high-profile transfers of Asian players to Europe, signing with Arsenal of the Premier League. Inamoto scored two goals for the Japanese national team at the 2002 World Cup, but had already been released by Arsenal shortly before the tournament began. He was then signed by Fulham on a long-term loan deal from Gamba Osaka. Initially he settled well at the London club, garnering good notices as a tough-tackling midfielder with an eye for a spectacular goal. He became a cult favourite quickly, scoring four goals over the two legs of Fulham's Intertoto Cup final against Bologna, scoring once in the first leg and a hat trick in the second. Other notable goals he scored in his time for Fulham include goals against Tottenham Hotspur, Sunderland, Middlesbrough and also in the 3–1 win against Manchester United at Old Trafford in October 2003.
He also scored in the FA Cup against Everton which commentator Barry Davies described as "a Japanese peach". Inamoto was also described as "bigger than Beckham" by the Japanese media. However, he sustained a fractured tibia in an international friendly against England, and returned to Gamba Osaka to do promotional work. Fulham were interested in signing him once more, but concerns remained over his recovery from injury.

Inamoto signed with West Bromwich Albion for a decidedly small £200,000 transfer fee, which was only to be paid once he had made an appearance for the Midlands club. However, Gary Megson departed as West Bromwich Albion manager shortly afterwards, and successor Bryan Robson was unsure of the player. Inamoto was loaned to Cardiff City for the latter part of the 2004–05 season, and impressed, being recalled to play a role in West Brom's survival campaign in the Premiership. In 2005–06 he was a regular in the West Brom side, and was called up to the Japan squad for the 2006 FIFA World Cup, the first Albion player to play in the tournament for 20 years. Whilst at West Brom Inamoto scored once, an extra time winner in a League Cup tie against former club Fulham on 25 October 2005.

On 31 August 2006, he signed for Galatasaray. On 29 May 2007, it was revealed that he signed a two-year contract with German club Eintracht Frankfurt, joining on a free transfer. Inamoto was presented in a press conference joining fellow Japanese striker Naohiro Takahara in Frankfurt and was released on 30 May 2009. On 19 June 2009, French Ligue 1 side Rennes announced that Inamoto had signed a contract with them.

Inamoto signed for J1 League club Kawasaki Frontale on 11 January 2010 in a move back to his homeland. He played for Frontale for 5 seasons. He resigned end of 2014 season. Inamoto then subsequently featured for side Consadole Sapporo (later Hokkaido Consadole Sapporo) in J2 League. Consadole won the 2016 season and was promoted to J1. However he could only play single-digit matches every season from 2016 season. He resigned at the end of 2018 season. In 2019, he signed with J3 League club SC Sagamihara.

International career
In August 1995, Inamoto was selected Japan U-17 national team for 1995 U-17 World Championship. He played all 3 matches. In April 1999, he was selected Japan U-20 national team for 1999 World Youth Championship. At this tournament, he played three matches and Japan came second place.

On 5 February 2000, Inamoto debuted for Japan national team under manager Philippe Troussier against Mexico. After the debuted, Inamoto played 10 matches or more every year under Troussier.

In September 2000, Inamoto was selected Japan U-23 national team for 2000 Summer Olympics. He played full-time in all 4 matches and scored a goal against Slovakia.

In 2000, Inamoto played at 2000 Asian Cup. He played four matches while Japan won the championship. In 2001, he also played at 2001 Confederations Cup. He played four matches and Japan came second place. In 2002, he was selected Japan for 2002 World Cup. He played all four matches and scored two goals against Belgium at first match and Russia at second match. Japan qualified to the knockout stage first time in Japan's history.

After 2002 World Cup, Inamoto played at 2003 and 2005 Confederations Cup. In 2006, he was selected Japan for 2006 World Cup. He played two matches while Japan was eliminated in the group stages.

After 2006 World Cup, Inamoto was not selected Japan 1 year for generational change. In June 2007, he played for Japan for the first time in a year. After that, he played several matches every year. In 2010, he was selected Japan for 2010 World Cup. He played two matches and Japan qualified to the knockout stage. This World Cup is his last game for Japan. He played 82 games and scored 5 goals for Japan.

Career statistics

Club

International

Scores and results list Japan's goal tally first, score column indicates score after each Inamoto goal.

Honours
Fulham
UEFA Intertoto Cup: 2002

Hokkaido Consodale Sapporo
J2 League: 2016

Japan U17
AFC U-17 Championship: 1994

Japan U20
FIFA World Youth Championship runner-up: 1999

Japan
AFC Asian Cup: 2000
FIFA Confederations Cup runner-up: 2001

Individual
J.League Best Eleven: 2000

References

External links

 
 
 Japan National Football Team Database
 
 

Living people
1979 births
People from Kagoshima Prefecture
Association football people from Kagoshima Prefecture
Japanese footballers
Association football midfielders
Japan international footballers
Japan youth international footballers
AFC Asian Cup-winning players
2000 AFC Asian Cup players
2001 FIFA Confederations Cup players
2002 FIFA World Cup players
2003 FIFA Confederations Cup players
2005 FIFA Confederations Cup players
2006 FIFA World Cup players
2010 FIFA World Cup players
Olympic footballers of Japan
Asian Games competitors for Japan
Footballers at the 1998 Asian Games
Footballers at the 2000 Summer Olympics
J1 League players
J2 League players
J3 League players
Premier League players
English Football League players
Ligue 1 players
Süper Lig players
Bundesliga players
Gamba Osaka players
Arsenal F.C. players
Fulham F.C. players
West Bromwich Albion F.C. players
Cardiff City F.C. players
Galatasaray S.K. footballers
Eintracht Frankfurt players
Stade Rennais F.C. players
Kawasaki Frontale players
Hokkaido Consadole Sapporo players
SC Sagamihara players
Nankatsu SC players
Japanese expatriate footballers
Japanese expatriate sportspeople in England
Expatriate footballers in England
Japanese expatriate sportspeople in Wales
Expatriate footballers in Wales
Japanese expatriate sportspeople in Turkey
Expatriate footballers in Turkey
Japanese expatriate sportspeople in France
Expatriate footballers in France
Japanese expatriate sportspeople in Germany
Expatriate footballers in Germany